Yelling or screaming is a loud vocalization.

Yelling may also refer to:

 Yelling (album), a 2009 album by Kay Tse
 Yelling, Cambridgeshire, a village in England
 Yelling (surname), an English surname (and list of people with that name)
 Yelling Settlement, Alabama, United States
 The Yelling (band), a punk rock band from Los Angeles, California

See also
 Yell (disambiguation)